Lega Lombarda (abbr. Established in 1984, it was one of the founding "national" sections of Lega Nord (LN) in 1991 and has been the regional section of Lega per Salvini Premier (LSP) in Lombardy since 2020. Along with Liga Veneta, the LL has formed the bulk of the federal party (LN/LSP), which was led by Lombards since its foundation.

The LL is currently led by a pro-tempore coordinator, Federico Cecchetti. Members of the party have included Umberto Bossi, Roberto Maroni, Roberto Calderoli, Giancarlo Giorgetti, Francesco Speroni, Roberto Castelli, Matteo Salvini, Gian Marco Centinaio and Attilio Fontana (President of Lombardy).

History

Foundation and formation of Lega Nord 
Lega Lombarda was officially founded on 12 April 1984 by Umberto Bossi, who used the resonance of the name of the historical Lega Lombarda when choosing the name. Originally Lega Autonomista Lombarda (Lombard Autonomist League, LAL), the party took the current name in 1986. At its electoral debut in the 1987 general election, Lega Lombarda gained 2.6% of the vote in Lombardy. Bossi was elected to the Senate and Giuseppe Leoni to the Chamber of Deputies.

The party participated in the 1989 European Parliament election as the leading member of the coalition named Lega Lombarda – Alleanza Nord, obtaining 8.1% in Lombardy and two MEPs elected (Francesco Speroni and Luigi Moretti).

In 1989–1990 the LL took part in the process of federating the Northern regionalist parties, ahead of the regional elections. In February 1991 it was merged into Lega Nord (LN) and since then it has been the "national" section of the LN in Lombardy. Bossi was subsequently elected federal secretary of the LN, while maintaining the role of national secretary of the LL for a while.

Negri, Calderoli, Giorgetti
In 1993 Luigi Negri took over as secretary, replacing Bossi, who had to choose between national and federal office.

After the 1994 general election, three LL members joined Berlusconi I Cabinet as ministers: Roberto Maroni (who had become the federal party's number two, after Bossi), Vito Gnutti and Speroni. The break-up of the coalition supporting the government led Negri and others to defect to the Federalist Italian League, while Maroni, despite disagreements with Bossi, chose to stay in the party.

Negri was replaced as secretary by Roberto Calderoli, who, as president, had evicted him from the party, despite being his brother-in-law. Calderoli led the party to its best result up to that point in the 1996 general election, when it gained 25.5%.

After the 2000 regional election, the party joined the regional government and has since been a member of it, with no exceptions. After the 2001 general election, three LL members joined Berlusconi II Cabinet as ministers: Bossi, Maroni and Roberto Castelli.

In 2002 Calderoli was replaced by Giancarlo Giorgetti, while Castelli became president.

In the 2010 regional election the party gained 26.2%, its best result so far.

Leadership of Salvini
In 2002 Giorgetti decided to step down from national secretary and the party elected its new leadership at a congress in June. Matteo Salvini ran as candidate of the faction around Roberto Maroni, while Cesarino Monti was the candidate of the old guard and of Bossi's loyalists. Salvini won the election with 74% of the votes, that is to say the support of 403 delegates out of 532. Soon after, Giorgetti was appointed national president.

In July 2012 Maroni was elected federal secretary of the LN by its federal congress. The Lombard delegates elected six members to the federal council: Giacomo Stucchi, Paolo Grimoldi, Andrea Mascetti, Gianni Fava, Simona Bordonali, and, on behalf of the minority, Marco Desiderati.

In the 2013 regional election Maroni was elected President of Lombardy with 42.8% of the vote.

Leadership of Grimoldi
In November 2013 Salvini succeeded to Maroni as Lega Nord's federal secretary and, later on, he appointed a commissioner, Stefano Borghesi, to fill the post. Borghesi was later replaced by Grimoldi. In November 2015 Grimoldi was elected national secretary of the party.

In May 2017, after Salvini's re-election as LN federal secretary, five LL members (Bordonali, Fabrizio Cecchetti, Giulio De Capitani, Simona Pergreffi and Jacopo Vignati) were elected to the federal council with Salvini, a sixth (Giorgetti) was elected as an independent and a seventh (Gianni Fava) on behalf of the minority. In December Stucchi was elected president of LL, replacing Giorgetti, who whose more and more involved at the federal level as deputy of Salvini.

In the 2018 regional election LL's Attilio Fontana was elected President of Lombardy with 49.8% of the vote and the party obtained 29.4%.

Re-foundation
Following the formation of Lega per Salvini Premier and 2019 federal congress of the LN, after which the latter became practically inactive, in February 2020 the LL was re-established as Lega Lombarda per Salvini Premier in order to become the regional section of the new party. The founding members of the new LL were Attilio Fontana, Paolo Grimoldi, Daniele Belotti, Stefano Borghesi, Fabrizio Cecchetti e Gian Marco Centinaio. Grimoldi continued to led the party through 2020.

In February 2021 Cecchetti replaced Grimoldi as pro-tempore coordinator.

Popular support
The party has its heartland in the northern and mountain provinces of Lombardy.

In the 2018 regional election it won 45.8% in Sondrio, 34.4% in Brescia, 36.7% in Bergamo, 33.4% in Lecco, 32.6% in Como and 30.9% in Varese (the party's cradle and original stronghold). However, the party obtained good results also in southern provinces, notably 33.4% in Lodi and 33.0% in Cremona.

The electoral results of Lega Lombarda in the region since 1989 are shown in the tables below.

Electoral results

Regional Council of Lombardy

Italian Parliament 
Only the results before Lega Nord's founding are reported here.

Leadership 
Secretary: Umberto Bossi (1984–1993), Luigi Negri (1993–1995), Roberto Calderoli (1995–2002), Giancarlo Giorgetti (2002–2012), Matteo Salvini (2012–2014), Stefano Borghesi (commissioner, 2014–2015), Paolo Grimoldi (2015–2021), Fabrizio Cecchetti (commissioner, 2021–present)
President: Augusto Arizzi (1986–1987), Silvana Bazzan (1987–1989), Franco Castellazzi (1989–1991), Francesco Speroni (1991–1993), Roberto Calderoli (1993–1995), Giuseppe Leoni (1995–1999), Stefano Galli (1999–2002), Roberto Castelli (2002–2012), Giancarlo Giorgetti (2012–2017), Giacomo Stucchi (2017–2020)

References

External links
Official website (out of date)

Political parties in Lombardy
Political parties established in 1984
Federalist parties in Italy
Lega Nord
1984 establishments in Italy